Carlos María Franzini (September 6, 1951 – December 8, 2017) was a prelate of the Roman Catholic Church. He served as bishop of Rafaela from 2000 until 2012, when he became archbishop of Mendoza.

Life 
Born in Buenos Aires, he was ordained to the priesthood on August 13, 1977, serving as a priest in the diocese of San Isidro.

On April 29, 2000, he was appointed bishop of Rafaela. Polti Franzini received his episcopal consecration on the following June 19 from Alcides Jorge Pedro Casaretto, bishop of San Isidro, with archbishop of Paraná, Estanislao Esteban Karlic, and archbishop of Mendoza, José María Arancibia, serving as co-consecrators.

On November 10, 2012, he was appointed archbishop of Mendoza, where he was installed on February 9, 2013.

He died on December 8, 2017 at the age of 66.

References

External links 
 catholic-hierarchy.org, Archbishop Carlos María Franzini

1951 births
2017 deaths
21st-century Roman Catholic bishops in Argentina
Roman Catholic archbishops of Mendoza
Roman Catholic bishops of Rafaela